Christiania Skiklub was a Norwegian Nordic skiing club, based in Oslo. It is currently located at Kringsjagrenda 33, 0861, Oslo, Norway.

It was founded in 1877, and arranged Husebyrennet in 1879 and 1881. In 1883 its members were instrumental in founding the Association for the Promotion of Skiing, which eventually arranged the Holmenkollen Ski Festival. In 1884 the club raised the world's first "ski cabin" at Frønsvollen.

References

Sports teams in Norway
Sports clubs established in 1877
1877 establishments in Norway
Sport in Oslo